Ruch was an anti-communist organisation operating in Poland between 1965 and 1970. Its stated aim was the replacement of Poland's Marxist-Leninist-governed one-party state with a representative democracy. The group planned an arson attack on the Lenin Museum in Poronin. Its members were apprehended by the Polish authorities and imprisoned.

Members
Marian Gołębiewski (soldier)
Andrzej Czuma
Łukasz Czuma
Stefan Niesiołowski
Benedykt Czuma

References

Polish dissident organisations
Political history of Poland
Polish People's Republic